The Colfax District Cemetery is a cemetery in Colfax, Placer County, California, at 180 N. Canyon Way.

References

External links 
 
 

Colfax, California
Protected areas of Placer County, California
Cemeteries in Placer County, California